5α-Dihydronormethandrone (5α-DHNMT; developmental code name RU-575), also known as 17α-methyl-4,5α-dihydro-19-nortestosterone or as 17α-methyl-5α-estran-17β-ol-3-one, is an androgen/anabolic steroid and a likely metabolite of normethandrone formed by 5α-reductase. Analogously to nandrolone and its 5α-reduced metabolite 5α-dihydronandrolone, 5α-DHNMT shows reduced affinity for the androgen receptor relative to normethandrone. Its affinity for the androgen receptor is specifically about 33 to 60% of that of normethandrone.

See also
 5α-Dihydronorethandrolone
 5α-Dihydronandrolone
 5α-Dihydronorethisterone
 5α-Dihydrolevonorgestrel

References

5α-Reduced steroid metabolites
1-Methylcyclopentanols
Androgens and anabolic steroids
Human drug metabolites
Estranes
Ketones
Progestogens